Aline is a town in Alfalfa County, Oklahoma, United States. The population was 207 at the 2010 census.

History
The Choctaw Northern Railroad (later owned by the Chicago, Rock Island and Pacific) became the county's first railway in 1901, connecting Aline to the other Alfalfa county towns of Augusta, Ingersoll, Lambert, Driftwood, Amorita, and on into Kansas.

Geography

Aline is connected to the state highway system via State Highway 8B. The town lies at the western terminus of the highway.

Demographics

As of the census of 2010, there were 207 people living in the town. There were 123 housing units at an average density of 480 per square mile (187/km2). The racial makeup of the town was 95.79% White, 0.93% Native American, 0.47% from other races, and 2.80% from two or more races. Hispanic or Latino of any race were 1.40% of the population.

There were 101 households, out of which 18.8% had children under the age of 18 living with them, 53.5% were married couples living together, 6.9% had a female householder with no husband present, and 36.6% were non-families. 35.6% of all households were made up of individuals, and 22.8% had someone living alone who was 65 years of age or older. The average household size was 2.12 and the average family size was 2.69.

In the town, the population was spread out, with 18.2% under the age of 18, 11.2% from 18 to 24, 21.5% from 25 to 44, 26.2% from 45 to 64, and 22.9% who were 65 years of age or older. The median age was 45 years. For every 100 females, there were 103.8 males. For every 100 females age 18 and over, there were 101.1 males.

The median income for a household in the town was $25,556, and the median income for a family was $28,333. Males had a median income of $26,500 versus $17,083 for females. The per capita income for the town was $12,710. About 22.4% of families and 24.1% of the population were below the poverty line, including 21.1% of those under the age of eighteen and 33.3% of those sixty five or over.

Notable person
 Harold G. Kiner (April 14, 1924 – October 2, 1944), United States Army Medal of Honor winner; born here

Historical Artifact
Aline is home to the Sod House Museum The museum encloses an original sod house, the only one still standing in Oklahoma that was built by a homesteader.

References

External links
 Encyclopedia of Oklahoma History and Culture - Aline

Towns in Alfalfa County, Oklahoma
Towns in Oklahoma